There are 75 properties listed on the National Register of Historic Places in Albany, New York, United States. Six are additionally designated as National Historic Landmarks (NHLs), the most of any city in the state after New York City. Another 14 are historic districts, for which 20 of the listings are also contributing properties. Two properties, both buildings, that had been listed in the past but have since been demolished have been delisted; one building that is also no longer extant remains listed.

The listed properties represent approximately 250 years of the city's history, from its 17th-century Dutch colonial origins to its suburban expansion in the mid-20th century. Reflecting Albany's position as New York's state capital are the main buildings of all three branches of state government. City Hall, the main offices of the city's school district, and the diocesan cathedrals of both the Episcopal and Roman Catholic churches are also included.

Some properties are recognized at least in part for unique attributes, such as the possible grave of the only British peer buried in the United States, the only destroyer escort still afloat and the only fireplace in that style remaining in the country. Others recognize historic firsts such as the discovery of electrical inductance, the first state government building in the country to house an educational agency and the first basketball game played outside Massachusetts, where the sport was invented. Prominent architects represented include nationally prominent figures such as Henry Hobson Richardson, Richard Morris Hunt, Richard Upjohn and Stanford White, as well as local ones like Marcus T. Reynolds. In addition to the architects and many state politicians, historic personages associated with the listed properties include George Washington, John McCloskey and Legs Diamond.

Overview

The National Register of Historic Places, the U.S. national heritage register, was established by the National Historic Preservation Act of 1966. It is administered by the National Park Service (NPS). Properties to be listed are usually first approved by the state historic preservation offices for listing on their state-level heritage register and then nominated to the National Register. Sometimes they are nominated directly to the National Register. In New York the board is under the auspices of the state's Office of Parks, Recreation and Historic Preservation.

A separate NPS program has jurisdiction over properties nominated for National Historic Landmark status, which must be formally granted by the Secretary of the Interior. There is no requirement that a property nominated for NHL status previously have been listed on the Register, although many were. NHLs that were not previously listed on the Register are listed administratively when they are designated NHLs. The NHL program predates the Register by a few years, and NHLs that had been designated prior to the establishment of the Register were administratively listed when the latter was established.

Geographical distribution

Outside the city, Albany County has another 148 listings. The city's 68 are 31 percent of the 214 total, the largest portion of any community in the county. One listing, the Albany Felt Company Complex, is shared with the neighboring town of Menands. Two of the listings, the USS Slater and Whipple Cast and Wrought Iron Bowstring Truss Bridge, were moved to Albany from other locations.

Most of the listed properties are located in central Albany, close to the Hudson River and the original boundaries of the city, an area today largely coterminous with one listing, the Downtown Albany Historic District. The south end of the Albany Felt Company Complex in the city's northeast corner is its easternmost listing. Near the city's southern boundary, overlooking Interstate 787, is Nut Grove, the southernmost entry. The Rapp Road Community Historic District, in an area rural for much of its existence until the development of Crossgates Mall nearby, is at the western and northern extreme.

The downtown historic district takes those boundaries from the stockade built by the Dutch as part of Fort Orange in 1624. The mostly buried remnants of the fort are one of the city's NHLs, and the oldest of its Register listings. Until the late 19th century, downtown and its neighboring areas was the entire developed city.

Historic districts

Historic districts are groupings of properties, usually under different ownership, that share a common historical background. They are sometimes recognized by local zoning codes. Not all are actually called historic districts—in Albany, the small "Broadway Row" of four townhouses is officially listed as Buildings at 744–750 Broadway. There are 14 historic districts listed on the Register in the city.

All but two of them districts are clustered, contiguously in some areas, in this same section of the city along the river. The districts range in size from  Washington Park to Broadway Row, Knox Street and the Lustron Houses of Jermain Street, all less than an acre (4,000 m2).

Combined, the historic districts equal , about 4% of Albany's total land area. They have over 2,000 buildings, structures, objects or sites within their boundaries. Over 90% of those are considered contributing properties to their districts' historic character.

Most of the districts are primarily residential enclaves, with some other uses scattered throughout. They reflect different stages of the city's growth, from onetime neighborhoods of the city's wealthy like the Ten Broeck Triangle to immigrant-settled areas like the Mansion District and South End. The two exceptions are downtown, primarily commercial, and the government buildings, monuments and parks that make up most of the Lafayette Park Historic District.

Property types and use

Of the remaining 43 extant listings, all but three are buildings or complexes of buildings. Those other three include one structure (the Whipple Cast and Wrought Iron Bowstring Truss Bridge), one maritime site (the USS Slater) and one archeological site (Fort Orange). The historic districts include some other structures, such as the parks that give two of them their names, and objects like the statues near the state capitol and one of the city's remaining trolley poles, among their contributing properties. Five listed buildings are vacant and one, the Abrams Building, remains listed despite its demolition in 1987.

Government and military

Reflecting Albany's status as New York's capital, 17 of the 41 extant buildings listed individually, more than one-third of that total, have been used for governmental purposes at some point. The city government is responsible for three of those, its school district for two and the federal government one (the Old Post Office), with the rest accounted for by state government. Among the latter are the main buildings of all three branches of state government: the governor's mansion (executive), Court of Appeals Building (judicial) and the state capitol (legislative). In only three other states is this so.

Among the contributing properties to the historic districts are two buildings representing the federal and county governments, both courthouses. The 1934 Art Deco James T. Foley United States Courthouse, in the downtown district, houses the United States District Court for the Northern District of New York as well as the local office of some other federal law enforcement agencies. When built it also replaced the Old Post Office. It is the only building used by the federal government among the Register listings in Albany. In 2020 it was listed on the Register individually.

Albany County government does not account for any individually listed properties. However, in the Lafayette Park district, the county courthouse is a contributing property. At that time it was used for all county governmental functions, but since then most non-judicial departments have moved to a 1920s 13-story office building on State Street  that contributes to the downtown historic district.

A prominent state government office, the Alfred E. Smith Building, also contributes to the Center Square/Hudson–Park Historic District. Some former police and fire buildings are contributing properties to that and other districts.

Four of the properties listed have, or have had, a military purpose. The original Fort Orange, built by the Dutch colonial authorities of New Netherland, defended the fledgling settlement. In the late 19th century, the state built the two armories for the National Guard. The Slater was commissioned by the Navy for service in the Pacific theater of World War II; it was later sold to the Greek Navy, where it was rechristened the Aetos.

Education, arts and sciences

Government entities also control the four buildings used for educational purposes. Three are used for administrative purposes—the Old Albany Academy Building, originally a private school, is the City School District of Albany's main offices, the former headquarters of the Delaware and Hudson Railroad is now the main administration building for the State University of New York (SUNY) system and the State Department of Education Building is home to that agency, which oversees public education in the state. The James Hall Office building has been annexed to one of the city's elementary schools, later used for a Montessori school. The former Philip Livingston Magnet Academy, now converted into senior apartments, is the only purpose-built public school building listed so far in Albany. Two former public school buildings are included as contributing properties in the South End district, and the former St. Joseph's Academy is a contributing property to Arbor Hill.

The Harmanus Bleecker Library, originally built by the city as its first library but now redeveloped privately as office space, is one of eight properties with a past or present cultural function. Of the other seven only two, the Albany Institute of History & Art and the Palace Theatre, are purpose-built for their continuing role. The Institute, the city's major museum, is joined by three historic house museums and the Slater in that function. Lastly, the Washington Avenue Armory is now used for some concerts. Contributing properties to the historic districts with cultural functions include the John A. Howe Branch library in the South End.

Three properties also commemorate scientific discoveries and technological accomplishments. As a professor at the Albany Academy, Joseph Henry discovered electrical inductance, which would later lead to the development of the telegraph and all subsequent information technology. The building has since been renamed in his memory. James Hall made many of his paleontological and geological breakthroughs from the research in his office and laboratory.

While Squire Whipple was an Albany resident whose bowstring truss bridge design was based on his own mathematical studies of the stresses on bridge trusses, work which helped move bridge building from a craft to a science, he did not have anything to do with the construction of the bridge that shares his name. It is believed to be the work of one of many bridge builder copying his design, which was portable and easy to assemble. Albany's bridge is one of only two in that design still in use in New York, one of the oldest surviving iron bridges in the country and one of the few of those that use both cast and wrought iron.

Religion and institutional

All 10 of the listed buildings used for religious purposes are or were Christian churches. Two are Catholic and six are used by various Protestant denominations (the Episcopal Church accounts for three). Church of the Holy Innocents, which is vacant, was built for an Episcopal congregation and later used for Russian Orthodox worship.

Three of the listed churches—the First Reformed Church St. Peter's Episcopal Church and St. Mary's Church—are home to Albany's oldest congregations in their denominations. The First Reformed Church, dating to 1634, is also the city's oldest church building and the oldest Christian congregation in upstate New York. St. Mary's, established near the end of the 18th century, is likewise the oldest Catholic congregation in the city and upstate. All Saints and Immaculate Conception are, respectively, the cathedrals of the Episcopal and Catholic dioceses of Albany. Immaculate Conception is further distinguished as the second-oldest Catholic cathedral in the state after St. Patrick's in New York City.

In the historic districts, fourteen churches are contributing properties. They include some prominent local churches, like St. Joseph's, the city's third Catholic church, in the Ten Broeck Triangle section of the Arbor Hill district. Others are historically important, like Mt. Calvary Baptist Church in the South End, the only remaining wood frame church in the city.  The one purpose-built synagogue among the contributing properties, Wilborn Temple in Center Square, has since been converted into a church.

Only one property is used for non-profit institutional use outside of a religious organization. Nut Grove, a former mansion on the south boundary of the city, is now part of a substance-abuse rehabilitation facility, following its use as a hospice. The Schuyler Mansion, another former center of a large estate, was used as an orphanage between the family's occupancy and its acquisition by the state.

Residential

All of the nine present or former residential properties listed are purpose-built single-family houses. Of them, only the governor's mansion is still used that way. Four of the others have been converted into office space or other commercial use and three old mansions—Cherry Hill and the Schuyler and Ten Broeck mansions—have been converted into historic house museums. The Stephen and Harriet Myers Residence, a former stop on the Underground Railroad, is vacant but being converted into one. Nut Grove, as noted above, is now part of a substance-abuse treatment center.

By contrast, the historic districts are overwhelmingly residential. The smallest ones—Jermain Street, Knox Street and Rapp Road—are composed entirely of houses. Four rowhouses, possibly to become office space, make up the Broadway Row. Among the larger districts closer to the city's core only downtown is primarily commercial or mixed-use, although a few older houses remain. The Lafayette Park district is mostly large government buildings, but has a residential block at one corner.

Most of the contributing residential properties, like the individually listed ones, were built as single-family homes. Most that are multiple-unit dwellings are those homes that have been subdivided into duplexes; however there are some apartment houses in Arbor Hill, Center Square and the South End. The latter two also have former industrial buildings that have been converted into apartments.

Commercial

Eleven of the listed buildings have either been built or adapted for commercial purposes. The former group accounts for six buildings. All but one remains in commercial use—the former headquarters of the Delaware and Hudson Railroad, now in government and educational reuse as the system administration building for the State University of New York. Commercially repurposed buildings were primarily houses, with four of those listed as such now serving as office space. One former government building, the city's Quackenbush Pumping Station, is now the Albany Pump Station brewpub.

Among the contributing properties to the downtown historic district are five of the listed commercial buildings, three purpose-built and two adapted, as well as the SUNY system administration building. Of the other six, only the Arnold House contributes to another historic district, Washington Park. Downtown's contributing properties also include other significant commercial buildings in the city's history such as the Home Savings Bank Building, Albany's tallest building at the time of its 1927 construction. Some of Center Square's rowhouses have also been converted into offices. Lark Street, with many shops, runs through the district as well. Another significant commercial corridor, South Pearl Street, runs through the South End and then the Mansion before reaching downtown. Green Street in the Pastures district also has a small row with commercial storefronts.

Transportation and infrastructure

Two listings—the former Union Station building and the Whipple Cast and Wrought Iron Bowstring Truss Bridge—served transportation purposes for most of their existence. The former was converted to office space after passenger train service stopped in 1968. The latter, once used as a road bridge into a farm on the city's outskirts, is now used only by pedestrians due to its age since the farm became a public park.

Outside of transportation purposes, there is one other building that was part of the city's infrastructure. The Albany Pump Station was formerly the Quackenbush Pumping Station of the city's water system. When the city switched from using the nearby Hudson River to Alcove Reservoir as its primary water source in 1937, it was taken out of service. After several decades of neglect it has been revived as a brewpub.

There are two significant transportation-related resources among the contributing properties to the historic districts. Most prominent is the former railroad bridge in the Broadway–Livingston Avenue Historic District, a Warren truss dating to 1900. In Center Square there is also one of the two surviving overhead wire poles from the city's trolley system.

Open space

Four parks in the city are included in its listings. Lincoln Park is listed individually, and Swinburne Park is listed along with neighboring Bleecker Stadium. Lafayette and Washington parks are contributing properties to the historic districts that bear their names.

Architects and architecture

Most of the listed properties date from the mid-19th to early 20th centuries, the period of the city's greatest prosperity and growth. As such the architectural styles most prevalent are from that era. From outside there are more from older periods than newer.

Despite the city's founding by the Dutch, only one listed property, the Van Ostrande–Radliff House, the city's oldest building, is a genuine example of Dutch Colonial architecture. Even then its Dutch features that do survive are more structural and internal, most notably its jambless fireplace, the only one in that style remaining in the country. English colonial styles are more visibly represented by the Georgian Schuyler Mansion.

The Ten Broeck Mansion, built near the end of the 18th century, is the earliest listing postdating American independence. Like Schuyler's a gabled brick estate house, its early use of the similarly classically-inspired Federal style shows the transition from colonial architecture to the modes of the new nation and century. Philip Hooker's First Reformed Church, another Federal structure completed shortly after Ten Broeck's mansion, was his first major building. With the Old Albany Academy Building in 1815 Hooker would further develop the Federal style in the city. The style persisted in vernacular forms as late as 1838, when the brick house of strawberry-farming pioneer James Wilson, the oldest contributing property to the Knox Street Historic District, was built.

Following the opening of the Erie Canal in the 1820s, a new generation of builders continued the evolution of the classically inspired form into the Greek Revival, which made its mark in the city shortly before mid-century. The houses of the Broadway Row show this transition from the Federal style. It would be used for both the upscale townhouses of Elk Street, one of Albany's most distinguished addresses for decades afterwards, and the restrained frame houses of Foley's Row in the South End, speculative housing built for lower-income buyers. The style was often used for public buildings, and in Albany it made its grand entrance with 1842's colonnaded State Hall (now the Court of Appeals Building), its rotunda using all three classical orders. South of the city limits at the time of its construction, Alexander Jackson Davis's Nut Grove is his only Greek Revival house within the Hudson Valley, and a rare example of the Grecian country house within that style.

The Victorian styles that dominated architecture in the second half of the century made their debuts in Albany at its midpoint. The small building in Lincoln Park where James Hall did his groundbreaking paleontological research is an Italian villa-style variant of the Italianate style, built from a pattern designed by Andrew Jackson Downing and his student Calvert Vaux, erected in 1852, the year of the former's death. Elsewhere in the city, the Italianate style proved ideal for the many rowhouses going up, particularly along Clinton Avenue, where different stretches show the transition from the Greek Revival and how it was applied before and after the Civil War. The Walter Merchant House on Washington Avenue, one of the more developed applications of the Italianate rowhouse in Albany, is one of the rare detached, larger ones remaining.

As they had elsewhere, churches were instrumental in bringing the Gothic Revival to Albany. The city's Episcopalians were the first, with Frank Wills' Church of the Holy Innocents in 1850. Two years later Patrick Keely built the Gothic Cathedral of the Immaculate Conception for the newly established Roman Catholic Diocese of Albany. Lutherans in the South End put up the German Evangelical Protestant Church, still a focal point of that neighborhood, in 1857. At the end of the decade the Episcopal Church brought in Gothic Revival pioneer Richard Upjohn, along with his son, to design the new St. Peter's Episcopal Church building in the French Gothic mode.

The complicated construction of the state capitol wound up embracing the century's later architectural movements. In 1867, Thomas Fuller began the new building in the Second Empire style. Nine years and three stories later, however, amid mounting criticism of his work and the costs of the project, he was replaced by Leopold Eidlitz and Henry Hobson Richardson, who oversaw the construction of the next two floors in the Renaissance Revival style. They lasted until 1883, when new governor Grover Cleveland replaced them with Isaac Perry, who supervised the building through its 1899 completion, moving toward a more Romanesque style as he did so.

Some of the architects who worked on the capitol graced Albany with other projects. After an 1880 fire destroyed city hall, Richardson designed its replacement, completed in 1883, a period when he is generally regarded as having been at his creative peak. Perry built the Washington Avenue Armory for the state seven years later. The Renaissance Revival style used for the capitol's later floors was complemented when that style was used for another project with a complicated history, the city's 1883 post office.

The more decorative styles of the fin de siècle began to appear in Albany during the 1890s. Richard Morris Hunt built the Rice Mansion, the only freestanding Beaux Arts mansion in the city, now part of the Albany Institute of History & Art, during that time. In the last years of the century, the new Union Station by Shepley, Rutan and Coolidge brought the style to where most visitors entered the city.

In the first decades of the new century, another new style, Colonial Revival, came to the city. Stanford White's Benjamin Walworth Arnold House, his only building in the city, was also the first to use it, in 1905. A decade later, the First Congregational Church of Albany 1917 Woodlawn building by Albert W. Fuller attracted considerable media attention as the first Colonial Revival church in the city. It would receive its highest application in the city 15 years later with the opening of Philip Livingston Junior High School at the city's northern entrance, one of its few landmark buildings outside downtown.

Historical context

Early expansion, fueled by the 1825 completion of the Erie Canal and the immigrant populations it attracted, largely went to the north and south of the original settlement, absorbing large earlier estates in the latter direction such as the Schuyler Mansion, Cherry Hill and Nut Grove leading to the development of the Arbor Hill, Mansion, Pastures and South End historic districts.

West of that historic core, the first city hall and state capitol buildings around what later became Lafayette Park spurred some development around them early in the 19th century. Near the end of the century, the completion of the current capitol and Washington Park gave a new impetus to the city's growth in that direction, opening up the Center Square neighborhood.

By the 1920s streetcar lines were running out to newer, more suburban neighborhoods to the west and southwest. Two of the listed churches helped pioneer the development of the Pine Hills neighborhood; the city built Hook and Ladder No. 4, the only fire station listed, to serve another new enclave. After World War II, another suburban building boom and new technologies combined to create the Lustron Houses of Jermain Street Historic District, the most recently constructed of the city's Register listings.

Listings

|}

Former listings

|}

See also

History of Albany, New York
National Register of Historic Places listings in Albany County, New York
National Register of Historic Places in New York

Notes

References

External links

Albany, New York
History of Albany, New York
Albany